John Themis is an Australian-born musician, songwriter and record producer, best known for his long-term work with Boy George and Culture Club, collaborating on many of their songs and albums since the 1990s. He also worked on Taboo, a musical roughly based on Boy George's life.

Themis co-wrote Emma Bunton's 2001 UK number one single, "What Took You So Long?", as well as co-writing Kylie Minogue's 2000 hit single, "Please Stay". Themis also co-wrote the United Kingdom's entry for the 2005 Eurovision Song Contest, "Touch My Fire", performed by singer Javine. The song finished 22nd in the contest and reached number 18 in the UK Singles Chart. Themis has also worked with many other musical artists, including Dido, Rod Stewart, Gabrielle, George Michael, the Spice Girls, Will Young, Stevie Wonder, Geri Halliwell, Lemar, Girls Aloud, Jamelia, Natalie Imbruglia, Elton John, Cher, Dolly Parton, Blondie, Pet Shop Boys, Anna Vissi, Ofra Haza and Lulu.

References

External links
 

Living people
Australian record producers
Australian songwriters
Australian people of Greek Cypriot descent
Year of birth missing (living people)